Rachel Jupp (born 1977) is a British television news and current affairs producer. She became the Editor of  the BBC's Panorama current affairs series in September 2016.

Early life
Jupp was raised in Twickenham. She attended Orleans Park School, Richmond upon Thames College (both in Twickenham), King's College, Cambridge (where she read social and political sciences) and Columbia University (where she studied for an MA in public administration). She worked as an intern for ITN while resident in the United States. Early in her career, she worked at the Demos think tank as a researcher and project manager.

Career
Jupp joined Channel 4 News in 2005. Her last post before joining the BBC was as Head of Home News on the programme, responsible for all coverage in the United Kingdom. She became a Deputy Editor of Newsnight in 2013, shortly after Ian Katz became its Editor. Her responsibilities included assigning members of the reporting team to prepare the filmed inserts.

In the beginning of September 2016, she was appointed (and assumed the post as) Editor of Panorama. She is the second female Editor of Panorama; Glenwyn Benson, responsible for the series between 1992 and 1995, was the first.

Personal life
Jupp's husband works for ITV News (as the channel brands its output from ITN); she was expecting the couple's third child in the beginning of 2017. Ben, her brother, is Director of Social Finance and was previously head of public services strategy and innovation in the Cabinet Office. He is married to the Labour MP Helen Hayes.

References

1977 births
Living people
BBC television producers
Channel 4 people
Panorama (British TV programme)